Ellsworth Hunt "Gus" Augustus (November 23, 1897 – May 16, 1964) was an American businessman from Cleveland, Ohio who served as the tenth National president of the Boy Scouts of America. He lived in Waite Hill, Ohio with his wife, Elizabeth Good "Betty" Augustus until his death in May 1964.

Biography
He was born on November 23, 1897 in Cleveland, Ohio.

Ellsworth, an avid amateur golfer, once beat Bobby Jones at a charity golf event. He was characterized in a 1920 issue of Vanity Fair magazine as being the country's most powerful driver off the tee, demonstrating his golf swing in a series of time lapse photos.

Augustus and his wife had four children, Daneen, Albert Anthony Augustus II, Elizabeth (Betsy), and Margaret (Peggy).

He served for four years during World War II on active duty as an officer in the United States Navy Reserve aboard the troop ship, USS West Point, which was converted from the ocean liner America.

In 1950 he was appointed as the Cuyahoga County coordinator of Civil Defense at the request of Cleveland Mayor Thomas A. Burke and the county commissioners. Although Augustus and his staff had little experience with civil defense and limited guidance from the federal government, the civil defense organization soon developed organizational plans for a county-wide program that called for "tens of thousands of volunteers" to be "the county's defense troops."

Augustus hoped to train one member from each family in Cuyahoga County, or 375,000 people, in first aid. Further volunteer opportunities included 30,000 to 40,000 air raid war- dens, 5,000 police auxiliary officers, and 3,000 auxiliary firemen. Local schools also participated in the civil defense program. In February 1951, Cleveland school officials sent a letter to all parents describing the civil defense efforts in schools. Some schools taught their students how to protect themselves by ducking under their desks and covering their heads — the well-known "Duck and Cover" technique.

Scouting
Augustus began his Scouting service in 1940 and served as vice president (1941–46) and president (1947–53) of the Greater Cleveland Council.  He joined the National Executive Board in 1950 serving as chairman of Region 4 from 1956 to 1959. He received the Silver Beaver and Silver Antelope awards in 1951 and the Silver Buffalo Award in 1954.

He was elected president of the Boy Scouts of America in 1959 and served for five years until 1964.  His service to the Scout movement included participating in the 11th World Scout Jamboree at Marathon, Greece, and 19th World Conference on the Isle of Rhodes. During 1964, he made an official visit to the Far East Council of the Boy Scouts of America with headquarters in Tokyo, Japan, and conferred with leaders of Scout associations in Taiwan, Korea, and Japan, where he received the highest distinction of the Scout Association of Japan, the Golden Pheasant Award.

Legacy
He was an honorary brother of Alpha Phi Omega. In 1967 the Boy Scouts of America opened the Ellsworth H. Augustus International Scout House on the grounds of the former national office in North Brunswick, New Jersey until closing in 1979 with the move of the office to Irving, Texas. Sub camp 20 at the 2001 National Scout Jamboree was named in his honor.

See also

References

Businesspeople from Cleveland
1964 deaths
1897 births
Presidents of the Boy Scouts of America
20th-century American businesspeople